The Daowai Mosque or Harbin Mosque is a mosque in Daowai District, Harbin, Heilongjiang, China. It is the largest mosque in Heilongjiang.

History
The mosque was originally built during the Guangxu Emperor of Qing Dynasty in 1897. Building extension was constructed in 2003.

Architecture
The mosque consists of prayer hall, office and other facilities. Covering an area of 426 m2, the prayer hall is located at the center of the building area which is opposite to the main gate. It can accommodate up to 600 people to perform prayers.

See also
 Islam in China
 List of mosques in China

References

1897 establishments in China
Buildings and structures in Harbin
Mosques completed in 1897